This article is about the particular significance of the year 1721 to Wales and its people.

Incumbents
Lord Lieutenant of North Wales (Lord Lieutenant of Anglesey, Caernarvonshire, Denbighshire, Flintshire, Merionethshire, Montgomeryshire) – Hugh Cholmondeley, 1st Earl of Cholmondeley 
Lord Lieutenant of Glamorgan – vacant until 1729
Lord Lieutenant of Brecknockshire and Lord Lieutenant of Monmouthshire – Sir William Morgan of Tredegar (from 7 March)
Lord Lieutenant of Cardiganshire – John Vaughan, 1st Viscount Lisburne (until 20 March); John Vaughan, 2nd Viscount Lisburne (from 21 March)
Lord Lieutenant of Carmarthenshire – vacant until 1755 
Lord Lieutenant of Pembrokeshire – Sir Arthur Owen, 3rd Baronet
Lord Lieutenant of Radnorshire – Thomas Coningsby, 1st Earl Coningsby (until 11 September); James Brydges, 1st Duke of Chandos (from 11 September)

Bishop of Bangor – Benjamin Hoadly (until 7 November); Richard Reynolds (from 3 December)
Bishop of Llandaff – John Tyler
Bishop of St Asaph – John Wynne
Bishop of St Davids – Adam Ottley

Events
11 January - Printer Isaac Carter marries Ann Lewis at Cenarth.
May - Prince William, the youngest child of the Prince and Princess of Wales, is taken ill with suspected smallpox; it turns out to be a false alarm, but inoculation becomes popular among aristocratic families as well as the royal family. 
30 December - Bridget Vaughan marries Arthur Bevan, a barrister.

Arts and literature

New books
Ellis Pugh - Annerch ir Cymru (first Welsh book published in America) 
John Prichard Prys - Difyrwch Crefyddol

Births
17 March - Jonathan Hughes, poet (died 1805)
30 November - John Egerton, bishop of Bangor (died 1787)
date unknown - John Walters, lexicographer
probable - Hugh Williams, Anglican priest and writer (died 1779)

Deaths
20 March - John Vaughan, 1st Viscount Lisburne, Lord Lieutenant of Cardiganshire and former MP for Cardiganshire, 53
8 July - Elihu Yale, American-born East India merchant and benefactor of Yale University, 72 (died in London)
28 July - Sir Edward Williams, MP, 61
3 September - Sir William Glynne, 2nd Baronet, 58
5 September - Thomas Edwards, orientalist, 69

References

1720s in Wales
Years of the 18th century in Wales